Union Bancaire Privée (UBP SA) is a private bank and wealth management firm headquartered in Geneva. UBP is one of the largest private banks in Switzerland, and serves private and institutional clients. The bank was founded in 1969 by Edgar de Picciotto, and is one of the best-capitalized banks in Switzerland, with CHF 160.4 billion of assets under management.

History
Edgar de Picciotto established the Compagnie de Banque et d’Investissements (CBI) in Geneva on 11 November 1969. CBI acquired TDB-American Express Bank in 1990, which led to the creation of the current entity, Union Bancaire Privée. UBP developed further with the takeover of the Discount Bank and Trust Company in 2002.

In 2011, UBP acquired the Swiss arm of Dutch state-owned ABN Amro Bank, a pure Swiss private bank. The same year, UBP also broadened its operations in Asia by establishing two joint ventures in Hong Kong and Taiwan with TransGlobe.

In 2012, UBP acquired Paris-based fund of hedge funds Nexar Capital Group, which has offices in London, Jersey and New York.

In May 2013, UBP announced the acquisition of Lloyds Banking Group’s International Private Banking business.

On 26 March 2015, UBP signed an agreement with the Royal Bank of Scotland Group (RBS) to buy the international private banking activities of RBS's subsidiary, Coutts & Co International. This meant that UBP assumed control of their entities in Switzerland, Monaco and the Middle East.

In May 2016 UBP announced it signed an agreement with SEB, a Nordic financial services group, enabling UBP to distribute SEB's Luxembourg fund range to institutional clients and third-party distributors.

In January 2017, UBP announced a partnership with Partners Group, the global private markets investment manager.

In May 2018, UBP announced it was acquiring Banque Carnegie Luxembourg.

In July 2018, UBP expanded its activities in the UK with the acquisition of ACPI.

In January 2019 the rating agency Moody's assigned UBP a long-term deposit rating of Aa2 with a stable outlook.

In 2021, UBP made two acquisitions. First, UBP acquired Millennium Banque Privée, a Geneva private banking subsidiary of Portuguese bank Banco Comercial Português, allowing UBP to broaden its footprint in Portuguese-speaking markets. The second acquisition was Danske Bank's wealth management business in Luxembourg, Danske Bank International, which brought assets under management at UBP's Luxembourg subsidiary to over CHF 33 billion.

Corporate affairs

Private banking
Union Bancaire Privée has over 300 private wealth managers in different countries and offers various management mandates and types of advice.

Asset management
UBP is a full-scale asset manager, providing a large range of investments specifically geared towards its institutional clients' needs. The bank offers a wide range of capabilities in asset allocation, equities, bonds, diversification strategies and alternative fund of funds.

Alternative investments
UBP has been active in the alternative investment industry since the 1970s. Over the years, it has built up a strong hedge fund advisory service and runs several pooled funds and personalized mandates. With the acquisition of Nexar in 2012, UBP demonstrated its "ongoing commitment" to the alternative industry.

In April 2013, UBP announced a partnership with Guggenheim Fund Solutions (GFS), which is specialized in managed accounts within the full spectrum of hedge fund strategies. Together, they launched a new hedge fund platform.

Sales and trading
UBP services include: advisory, structured products, equity trading and brokerage, equity arbitrage, currency and precious metal trading, forwards and derivatives, treasury management and bond trading. UBP has over 40 specialist traders working with private wealth managers.

Investment philosophy
Every year, UBP publishes an annual outlook with an overview of macroeconomic events that occurred during the past year and its investment convictions for the year to come.

Financials
As of the end of December 2021, UBP's balance sheet total reached CHF 38.7 billion. By pursuing a conservative approach to risk-management, UBP has maintained a solid financial base and a strong balance sheet with a high level of liquidity. With a Tier 1 capital ratio of 25.2 percent (as of 31 December 2021), UBP is one of the best-capitalized banks in Switzerland.

Settlement with Investment Securities Trustee
Despite being a victim of the Madoff investment scandal, the bank offered, in March 2009, to compensate eligible investors 50 percent of the money they had initially invested with Madoff.

On 6 December 2010, UBP announced it had reached a settlement with the trustee when it agreed to pay $500 million. UBP was the first bank to settle the trustee's claim in the Bernie Madoff case. With this settlement, the trustee has agreed to discharge the "clawback" claims against UBP, its affiliates and clients.

See also
List of investors in Bernard L. Madoff Securities

References

Financial services companies of Switzerland
Banks established in 1969
Swiss companies established in 1969
Companies based in Geneva
Madoff investment scandal
Banks of Switzerland
Private banks